Anthony Canute Lund (February 25, 1871 – June 11, 1935) was the director of the Mormon Tabernacle Choir in Salt Lake City, Utah from 1916 until 1935. Lund was also a professor of music at Brigham Young University.

Early life and education
Lund was born of Danish immigrant Anthon H. Lund in Ephraim, Utah Territory. He began taking organ lessons at the age of eight. At 18, he was made choir director in Ephraim. In 1891, Lund graduated from Brigham Young Academy as valedictorian of his class. He then studied at the Royal Conservatory in Leipzig. He also did studies in London and Paris.

Leadership
In 1895, at the age of 25, Lund served as the youngest member of the Utah Constitutional Convention, which allowed the Utah territory to become a state in America. In 1897, Lund became head of what was then the Brigham Young Academy Music Department.  Under his direction it was changed from being a department to being a school of music in 1901. He continued as head of the music department after the school became Brigham Young University. Lund served as the president of the BYU Alumni Association from 1904 to 1905. He also was on the faculty of the Utah Conservatory and the McCune School of Music. Lund served on the LDS Church's first General Music Committee, established in 1920.

Lund's left BYU to direct the Mormon Tabernacle Choir in 1916, and BYU had difficult replacing him. Lund replaced Evan Stephens as choir director. He implemented a European choral sound, and directed the choir in its first electrical recordings on the Victor Label. Lund held the position of choir director until his death in 1935. He was succeeded as director of the choir by J. Spencer Cornwall.

Lund also composed music. Some of Lund's most popular compositions include "Day Follows Night", "Build Thee More Stately Mansions, O My Soul", and "Bring, O Heavy Heart, Your Grief to Me". He worked in collaboration with Herbert S. Auerbach on these songs.

Family and death
Lund married Cornelia Sorenson on December 21, 1902. The two met at Brigham Young Academy. They had six children together. Lund died at home on June 11, 1935, of a heart attack and kidney trouble. A public funeral service was held in Lund's honor on June 16, 1935. Over 6,000 people were in attendance of the services held at the Salt Lake Tabernacle. An additional memorial service was held in Lund's hometown of Ephraim the same day.

Notes

References
Utah Artists Project - Julia Farnsworth Lund Wassner at www.lib.utah.edu
Campus Photos : Browse at contentdm.lib.byu.edu This link includes two photos that contain Anthony C. Lund

External links
Anthony C. Lund notes and talks, MSS 276 box 4 folder 4, L. Tom Perry Special Collections, Harold B. Lee Library, Brigham Young University
Lund, Anthony C., UA 909 Series 1 box 110 folder 29, L. Tom Perry Special Collections, Harold B. Lee Library, Brigham Young University

1871 births
1935 deaths
American choral conductors
American male conductors (music)
Latter Day Saints from Utah
Brigham Young University alumni
Brigham Young University faculty
Burials at Salt Lake City Cemetery
Tabernacle Choir music directors
People from Ephraim, Utah
People of Utah Territory
American expatriates in Germany
Harold B. Lee Library-related University Archives articles